Wise Temple may refer to:

Isaac M. Wise Temple, Cincinnati, Ohio
Stephen S. Wise Temple, Los Angeles, California
Stephen S. Wise Temple Elementary School